A may refer to:

 CTV Two a Canadian English language television system that had "A" as its channel ident.
 Matthew Arnold who wrote The Strayed Reveller and Other Poems as "A".